San Benito High School is a public high school located in the city of San Benito, Texas (USA) and classified as a 6A school by the UIL. It is a part of the San Benito Consolidated Independent School District located in southwestern Cameron County. In 2015, the school was rated "Met Standard" by the Texas Education Agency.

Athletics
The San Benito Greyhounds compete in these sports - 

Baseball
Basketball
Cross Country
Football
Golf
Powerlifting
Soccer
Softball
Tennis
Track and Field
Volleyball
Wrestling

Theater
One Act Play 
1961(3A)

References

External links
 
 San Benito Consolidated Independent School District

Educational institutions in the United States with year of establishment missing
High schools in Cameron County, Texas
Public high schools in Texas